Country-wide local elections for seats in municipality and county councils were held throughout Norway in 1983. For most places this meant that two elections, the municipal elections and the county elections ran concurrently.

Results

Municipal elections
Results of the 1983 municipal elections.

County elections
Results of the 1983 county elections.

References

1983
1983
1983 elections in Europe
1983 in Norway